Taylor Moore (born July 28, 1993) is an American professional golfer. After turning professional in 2016, he progressed through the PGA Tour's development tours, graduating to the top-level PGA Tour in 2021. He has one victory on the tour, the Valspar Championship in 2023.

Amateur career
In 2014, Moore won the Saguaro Amateur. He also tied as the leading medallist in the stroke play qualifying round of U.S. Amateur.

Professional career
Moore turned professional in 2016. That year, he played on the PGA Tour Canada, where he had five top-10 finishes and one victory, at the Staal Foundation Open; he finished third on the tour's order of merit to graduate to the Korn Ferry Tour for 2017. He played on the Korn Ferry Tour for four seasons, one of which was disrupted by suffering from a collapsed lung which left him unable to play for several months. He claimed his first victory on the Korn Ferry Tour in 2021, at the Memorial Health Championship, during the COVID-19 pandemic-extended 2020–21 season; he ended that season in fourth place on the regular season points list to earn his PGA Tour card for the 2021–22 season.

At the Valspar Championship in March 2023, Moore won for the first time on the PGA Tour; he overcame a two-stroke deficit in the final round to win by one from Adam Schenk.

Personal life
Moore was born in San Angelo, Texas. He attended the University of Arkansas. In 2015, he was suspended from competing by the university after he was arrested and charged with felony voyeurism, alongside Nico Echavarría; he later pleaded guilty to a lesser misdemeanor charge, while Echavarría was found not to have been involved.

Amateur wins
2014 Saguaro Amateur
2016 The All American

Source:

Professional wins (3)

PGA Tour wins (1)

Korn Ferry Tour wins (1)

PGA Tour Canada wins (1)

Results in The Players Championship

"T" indicates a tie for a place

See also
2021 Korn Ferry Tour Finals graduates

References

External links

American male golfers
Arkansas Razorbacks men's golfers
PGA Tour golfers
Korn Ferry Tour graduates
People from San Angelo, Texas
Golfers from Dallas
1993 births
Living people